Elista is the capital city of the Republic of Kalmykia, Russia.

Elista may also refer to:
Elista Urban Okrug, a municipal formation which the City of Elista in the Republic of Kalmykia, Russia is incorporated as
Elista Airport, an airport in the Republic of Kalmykia, Russia
FC Elista, a defunct association football club from Elista in the Republic of Kalmykia, Russia, which was active in 2005–2006